John F. Bentivegna is a Command chief master sergeant in the United States Space Force who serves as the Senior Enlisted Advisor to the Deputy Chief of Space Operations for Operations, Cyber, and Nuclear. He previously served as the senior enlisted leader of the Combined Force Space Component Command and command chief of the Space Operations Command.

Awards and decorations

References

External links 

Living people
Year of birth missing (living people)
Place of birth missing (living people)
Space Operations Command personnel
Recipients of the Defense Superior Service Medal